Le Bon Usage (Good Usage), informally called Le Grevisse, is a descriptive book about French grammar first published in 1936 by Maurice Grevisse, and periodically revised since.  It describes the usage of the French language, primarily in its written literary form.

Description 
Quite extensive (1600 pages), it includes numerous examples and counter-examples taken from Francophone literature of various periods, including newspapers, to form a reference for teachers of French, and in particular, authors and editors.

Editions

In 1936, the first edition was published by De Boeck Supérieur (then named Duculot).  A new edition was published in 1939, and another in 1946.  The book was awarded the gold medal of the Académie française. The high praise of André Gide in the literary supplement of Le Figaro in February 1947 contributed to its success.

After the death of Grevisse in 1980, his son-in-law André Goosse, also a grammarian, took over and published the 12th and 13th (1993) editions. The 14th edition was published in August 2007 in a completely new format. The 15th edition appeared in 2011. Since then there has been a 16th edition.

Online Copy
Le Bon Usage is available on-line by paid subscription.

See also 

French grammar

References

External links 

  Official website
  Biographical notice from the 13th edition
  Guy Lemaire raconte: Maurice Grevisse RTBF journalist Guy Lemaire on Grevisse, 2005

French grammar
Belgian books
Grammar books
Style guides
1936 non-fiction books